Peridroma coniotis is a moth of the family Noctuidae. It was first described by George Hampson in 1903. It is endemic to the Hawaiian islands of Kauai and Hawaii.

The larvae feed on Chenopodium species.

Subspecies
Peridroma coniotis coniotis (Kauai, Hawaii)
Peridroma coniotis rufata (Warren, 1912) (Kauai)

External links

Noctuinae
Endemic moths of Hawaii
Moths described in 1903